Je suis en vie may refer to 

Je suis en vie (album)", 2015 album by Akhenaton
"Je suis en vie" (song), song by Grégory Lemarchal from his 2005 album Je deviens moi